The Calgary Roughnecks are a lacrosse team based in Calgary, Alberta playing in the National Lacrosse League (NLL). The 2006 season was the 5th in franchise history.

The Roughnecks finished third in the west but lost to Colorado in the division semi-finals.

Regular season

Conference standings

Game log
Reference:

Playoffs

Game log
Reference:

Player stats
Reference:

Runners (Top 10)

Note: GP = Games played; G = Goals; A = Assists; Pts = Points; LB = Loose Balls; PIM = Penalty minutes

Goaltenders
Note: GP = Games played; MIN = Minutes; W = Wins; L = Losses; GA = Goals against; Sv% = Save percentage; GAA = Goals against average

Awards

Transactions

Trades

Roster
Reference:

See also
2006 NLL season

References

Calgary